Title III may mean:
Elementary and Secondary Education Act, Title III Part A, a United States federal grant program to improve education (U.S. Elementary and Secondary Education Act of 1965)
Jumpstart Our Business Startups Act, the 2015 equity crowdfunding rules
USA PATRIOT Act, Title III, the 2001 money laundering law
Omnibus Crime Control and Safe Streets Act of 1968, the 1968 wiretap law